The air sports competition at the 2022 World Games took place in July 2022, in Birmingham in United States, at the Barber Motorsports Park.
Originally scheduled to take place in July 2021, the Games have been rescheduled for July 2022 as a result of the 2020 Summer Olympics postponement due to the COVID-19 pandemic. Drone racing made its debut as official discipline in World Games sports programme.

Qualification

Participating nations

Medal table

Events

References

External links
 Fédération Aéronautique Internationale
 Air sports on IWGA website
 Air sports results book
 Drone racing results book

2022 World Games